Pedro Max Fernando Frontin (8 February 1867 – 7 April 1939) was an Admiral from the Brazilian Navy. He fought alongside the Triple Entente during World War I.

Still occupied the post of Naval Chief Officer, Minister of Military Justice, Director of the Brazilian Naval School for Officials, Commander of the Brazilian Marine Corps, Commander of the Second Naval Division.

Navy Career and First World War
Admitted in the Naval School on 3 March 1882 at the age of fifteen, he obtained all his promotions by merit, since he reached the grade of Lieutenant, Junior Grade or "Primeiro-Tenente", on 8 January 1890. During his career, he commanded the ships Brazilian battleship São Paulo, Rio Grande do Sul, Brazilian cruiser Bahia, CT Piauí and Laurindo Pitta.

Admiral Frontin was also the Chief Commander of the Brazilian Naval Division during 1918 in World War I, on the side of the Triple Entente. The Brazilian fleet under his charge operated from the North African Coast to the Mediterranean Sea. It stood in the operations together with British, French, Japanese and U.S. Navies.

During his life, he was decorated with the U.S. Distinction Golden Medal for his services during World War I, Cross of the Leopold II of Belgium; Italy's Golden medal; First Class of Japanese Empire.

He also held the positions of Chief of Staff of the Navy, Minister of the Superior Military Tribunal, Director of the Naval War School, Commander of the National Sailors Corps, Commander of the 2nd Naval Division and Commander of the Battles Division. He was minister of the Superior Military Court between 1926 and 1938. He was president of the court between 18 July 1934 and 19 February 1938, the date of his retirement. He died a little more than one after his estrangement.

One of his famous quotes was: "When it is not possible to do what you have to do, you must do all your can!".

He died on 6 April 1939, in Rio de Janeiro.

See also
 Brazil during World War I
 Brazilian Navy
 Brazilian Expeditionary Force World War II

Bibliography
 Maia, Prado (1961). D.N.O.G. (Divisão Naval em Operações de Guerra), 1914-1918: uma página esquecida da história da Marinha Brasileira. Serviço de Documentação Geral da Marinha.
 Vultos da História Naval, Rio de Janeiro, SDGM.

1867 births
1939 deaths
Brazilian admirals
People from Petrópolis
Admirals of World War I